Razan (also Romanized as Rāzān; also known as Rāzāt) is a village in Salehan Rural District, in the Central District of Khomeyn County, Markazi Province, Iran. At the 2006 census, its population was 353, in 103 families.

References 

Populated places in Khomeyn County